Rhein (A513) is the third ship of the s of the German Navy.

Development 

The Elbe-class replenishment ships are also known tenders of the German Navy. In German, this type of ship is called Versorgungsschiffe which can be translated as "supply ship" though the official translation in English is "replenishment ship". 

They are intended to support German naval units away from their home ports. The ships carry fuel, provisions, ammunition and other matériel and also provide medical services. The ships are named after German rivers where German parliaments were placed.

Construction and career 
Rhein was launched in March 1993 in Bremen-Vegesack, Germany. She was commissioned on 1 September 1993.

On 20 June 2018, Rhein left her home port of Kiel. The ship, which is part of the support squadron, will be the flagship of the Standing NATO Mine Countermeasures Group 2 (SNMCMG2) and the Black Sea for the next six months.

Gallery

References

External links 

Elbe-class replenishment ships
1993 ships
Ships built in Bremen (state)